The Memoirs of Solar Pons is a collection of detective fiction short stories by American writer August Derleth.  It was released in 1951 by Mycroft & Moran in an edition of 2,038 copies.  It was the second collection of Derleth's Solar Pons stories which are pastiches of the Sherlock Holmes tales of Arthur Conan Doyle.

Contents

The Memoirs of Solar Pons contains the following tales:

 "Introduction", by Ellery Queen
 "The Adventure of the Circular Room"
 "The Adventure of the Perfect Husband"
 "The Adventure of the Broken Chessman"
 "The Adventure of the Dog in the Manger"
 "The Adventure of the Proper Comma"
 "The Adventure of Ricoletti of the Club Foot"
 "The Adventure of the Six Silver Spiders"
 "The Adventure of the Lost Locomotive"
 "The Adventure of the Tottenham Werewolf"
 "The Adventure of the Five Royal Coachmen"
 "The Adventure of the Paralytic Mendicant"

Reprints
Los Angeles: Pinnacle, 1975.

Summary of Solar Pons cases
Solar Pons

References

1951 short story collections
Mystery short story collections
Sherlock Holmes pastiches
Solar Pons
Books by August Derleth